Ryan Thomas Fitzgerald (born October 19, 1994) is an American professional ice hockey forward who is currently playing with the Lehigh Valley Phantoms in the American Hockey League (AHL). He was selected by the Boston Bruins with the last pick in the 4th round (120th overall) of the 2013 NHL Entry Draft.

Early life
Fitzgerald was born in Boca Raton, Florida, when his father Tom was a member of the Florida Panthers. As a result of his father's career, he grew up in Florida and Tennessee, before his family settled in North Reading, Massachusetts.

Playing career

Amateur
Fitzgerald played for Malden Catholic High School of MIAA Catholic Conference and the Valley Jr. Warriors of the Eastern Junior Hockey League before committing to play for Boston College Eagles in the Hockey East conference of the NCAA. He was the 2012 MVP of the CCM/USA Hockey All-American Prospects Game.

Collegiate

Fitzgerald joined the Eagles in the 2013-14 season and made an impact immediately as a rookie, being named the conference's rookie of the month for November, in just his second month of collegiate play. Playing alongside Hobey Baker winner Johnny Gaudreau, Fitzgerald finished the season fifth on the team in scoring with 29 points as the Eagles made a deep NCAA tournament run, coming up just short of the title game after falling to eventual champions Union in the Frozen Four.

Fitzgerald's sophomore campaign was consistent, as he led the team in goals scored (17) and finished fourth on the team scoring (25), despite an early exit from postseason play.

Fitzgerald's junior year was a breakout year as he led the team in both goals scored (24) and overall scoring (47), helping the team to another deep NCAA tournament run. However, the Eagles would fall short of the championship yet again, after being defeated by the Quinnipiac Bobcats in the Frozen Four. For his efforts during the season, Fitzgerald was named a Hockey East 1st-Team All-Star as well as an NCAA 2nd-Team All-American.

For his senior year, Fitzgerald was named an assistant captain of the Eagles, but dipped in his point production as the Eagles had an off year in terms of postseason success. Fitzgerald scored 12 goals and 31 points on the year as the Eagles reached the Hockey East tournament Championship, but fell to the UMass Lowell River Hawks and failed to qualify for the NCAA tournament. Fitzgerald ended his NCAA career with 66 goals and 132 points.

Professional
With the completion of his collegiate career, Fitzgerald was signed to a two-year entry-level contract with the Boston Bruins on March 24, 2017. He immediately joined AHL affiliate, the Providence Bruins, on an amateur try-out basis to play out the remaining 2016–17 season.

After parts of four seasons within the Bruins organization, playing exclusively with AHL affiliate, the Providence Bruins, Fitzgerald left as a free agent. Unable to garner NHL interest, Fitzgerald agreed to a one-year AHL contract with the Lehigh Valley Phantoms, affiliate to the Philadelphia Flyers, for the 2020–21 season on January 18, 2021. In the shortened AHL season with the Phantoms, Fitzgerald increased his scoring output, registering 12 goals and 21 points through only 27 regular season games.

As a free agent, Fitzgerald opted to continue within the Flyers organization, securing a one-year, two-way NHL contract with Philadelphia on July 28, 2021.

On August 16, 2022, Fitzgerald continued his tenure with the Phantoms, signing a one-year AHL contract as a free agent.

Personal life
Fitzgerald's father is Tom Fitzgerald, a former player in the NHL and the current general manager of the New Jersey Devils. His younger brother, Casey, is a Buffalo Sabres prospect and played with Ryan when they both attended Boston College. He is also cousins with former Eagles and NHL player Kevin Hayes, along with his late brother Jimmy Hayes as well as NHL players Brady, Matthew and Keith Tkachuk.

Career statistics

Regular season and playoffs

International

Awards and honors

References

External links

1994 births
Living people
American men's ice hockey forwards
Boston Bruins draft picks
Boston College Eagles men's ice hockey players
Ice hockey players from Massachusetts
Lehigh Valley Phantoms players
Providence Bruins players
AHCA Division I men's ice hockey All-Americans